Madappa Prakash (born December 28, 1953, in Mysore) is an Indian-American nuclear physicist and astrophysicist, known for his research on the physics of neutron stars and heavy-ion collisions.

Education and career
Prakash grew up in Mysore. At the University of Mysore he graduated with a bachelor's degree in 1971 and a master's degree in 1973. At the University of Bombay (now the University of Mumbai), he received in 1979 his PhD with a dissertation on nuclear fission. From 1974 to 1981 he held a position as a scientific officer at the Bhabha Atomic Research Centre. As a postdoc he was from 1979 to 1981 on leave of absence for study and research at Copenhagen's Niels Bohr Institute. At the State University of New York at Stony Brook he taught and did research from 1982 to 2005 and collaborated extensively with James Lattimer. From 2005 to the present, Prakash is a professor at Ohio University. In 2020 he and another Ohio University professor became participants in the Network for Neutrinos, Nuclear Astrophysics, and Symmetries (N3AS) Physics Frontier Center, with headquarters at the University of California, Berkeley.

Prakash's research deals with neutron stars and with atomic nuclei and nuclear matter under extreme conditions of density, temperature, and magnetic fields.

In 2001 Prakash was elected a Fellow of the American Physical Society for "fundamental research into the properties of hot and dense matter, providing a basis for understanding relativistic heavy ion collisions and the structure and composition of neutron stars." In 2022 he received the Hans A. Bethe Prize with citation:

Selected publications
 
 
  (over 850 citations)
 
 
  (over 1700 citations)
  (over 1500 citations)
 
  (over 1000 citations)
  (over 1550 citations)

References

1953 births
Living people
20th-century Indian physicists
21st-century Indian physicists
20th-century American physicists
21st-century American physicists
Indian nuclear physicists
American nuclear physicists
Indian astrophysicists
American astrophysicists
University of Mysore alumni
University of Mumbai alumni
Stony Brook University faculty
Ohio University faculty
Fellows of the American Physical Society
Scientists from Mysore